Tretes is a mountain tourist area in East Java, Indonesia. This area is located 60 km south of Surabaya, capital city of East Java and its administrative is part of Prigen, Pasuruan Regency. Tretes area is located at the slopes mountain of Arjuno-Welirang. The area is popular area for tourism. This area is located at an altitude of 600–900 meters above sea level.

Etymology
The word of Tretes comes from the water dripping sounds alike "tes" "tes". This can be seen by the presence of a source of water dripping in the cracks of the stone walls in the Dong Biru area (located near the area of Kakek Bodo tourist attractions and from the direction of Surabaya located on the right side of main road).

History
Since long time ago the Tretes was known as one of main rest area in Java because of its natural scenic and cool air. Tretes was once known as the rest area of the Dutch colonial people. In this area there are many Dutch heritage buildings. Usually in the form of a European-style wooden house, which at this time the number began to decrease due to poorly maintained. In fact, many of the villa's buildings have been demolished. Some of the building's names are Dong De (Gedung Gede), Dong Koco (Glass Building), Dong Ijo, Dong Biru, Eskam (currently Surya Hotel). There is not much history of Tretes that can be known, one of the places that is a silent witness to history is the existence of ancient tombs in Gang Kramat 77 Pesanggrahan which is a tomb from the forerunner of the population of Tretes.

Geography
Tretes is on the slopes of several mountains and is at an average altitude of 600-900 meters above sea level with air temperatures reaching an average of 18-22 degrees Celsius. Tretes is surrounded by several mountains, including:
Mount Arjuno-Welirang
Mount Anjasmoro
Mount Penanggungan

Climate
The climate is tropical monsoon (Am) in Tretes, bordering with subtropical highland climate (Cwb) according to the Köppen-Geiger climate classification. Rainfall is significant most months of the year, and the short dry season has little effect. The average temperature in Tretes is 21.7 °C. In a year, the average rainfall is 3176 mm.

Panorama

Tourism 
There is many tourism place in Tretes, for example is:
 Alap-Alap Waterfall
 Kakek Bodo Waterfall
 Putuk Truno Waterfall
 Tretes Market

Notably Hotels and Villas 
At Tretes there are many villa and hotel, for example:
 Surya Hotel
 Inna Tretes
 Pines Garden
 Tanjung Plaza Hotel
 Royal Senyiur Hotel

See also
 Prigen
 Mount Penanggungan
 Arjuno-Welirang

References

External links 
 Official Website of Tretes

Geography of East Java
Pasuruan Regency